"" ("The moonlit evening"), WAB 200, is a lied composed by Anton Bruckner in  for Aloisia Bogner.

History 
The 16-year old Aloisia Bogner, alias Louise or Luise Bogner, was the older daughter of Michael Bogner, by whom Bruckner had his living accommodation. Bruckner composed for her also the Frühlingslied and the piano works Lancier-Quadrille, WAB 120, and Steiermärker, WAB 122.

The manuscript of the lied is part of the workbook , which also contains transcriptions of Friedrich Silcher's Ännchen von Tharau,  from Anton Emil Titl's opera , and Franz Wilhelm Abt's waltz .

A facsimile of the workbook has been issued in the Oberösterreichische Schriften zur Volksmusik in 2015.

Text 

Bruckner's song is based on the poem Der Mondabend by :
Rein und freundlich lacht der Himmel nieder auf die dunkle Erde,
Tausend goldne Augen blinken lieblich in die Brust der Menschen,
Und des Mondes lichte Scheibe segelt heiter durch die Bläue.

Auf den goldnen Strahlen zittern süßer Wehmut Silbertropfen,
Dringen sanft mit leisem Hauche in das stille Herz voll Liebe,
Und befeuchten mir das Auge mit der Sehnsucht zartem Thaue.

Funkelnd prangt der Stern des Abends in den lichtbesäten Räumen,
Spielt mit seinen Demantblitzen durch der Lichte Duftgewebe,
Und viel holde Engelsknaben streuen Lilien um die Sterne.

Schön und hehr ist wohl der Himmel in des Abends Wunderglanze,
Aber meines Lebens Sterne wohnen in dem kleinsten Kreise:
In das Auge meiner Sylli sind sie alle hingezaubert.
The heavens laugh down pure and friendly upon the dark earth,
Thousand golden eyes shine lovingly into the breast of men,
And the bright disk of the moon sails merrily through the blue.

Silvery drops of sweet wistfulness tremble upon the golden rays,
Press gently with soft sighing full of love into the quiet heart,
And moisten my eyes with tender dew of longing.

The evening star shines sparkling in the light-sown space,
Plays with its diamond flashes through the fragrant web of light,
And many gentle angel youths strew lilies about the stars.

The heavens are fair and noble in the wondrous glow of evening,
But the stars of my life abide in the smallest circle:
They have all been enchanted into the eyes of my Sylli.

Music 

A reminiscence – in the same key (A major), meter and first four notes – of Schubert's Der Mondabend, a lied which Aloisia Bogner liked very much.<ref>The two lieder are compared in Böck liest Bruckner I.</ref>

 Discography 

There are two recording of "Der Mondabend":
 Robert Holzer (bass),  (piano), Anton Bruckner: Lieder, Chöre, Magnificat – CD: Gramola 99071, 2015; a reissue of CD LIVA 046 Anton Bruckner Lieder/Magnificat (2011), with, as an addition, the premiere recording of Der Mondabend. NB: Transposed to E major.
 Elisabeth Wimmer (soprano), Daniel Linton-France (piano), Bruckner, Anton – Böck liest Bruckner I – CD: Gramola 99195, 3 October 2018 – first and third strophes in Schubert’s setting, second and fourth in Bruckner's setting.

 References 

Sources
 Lieder für Luise Bogner. Eine Volksliedersammlung Anton Bruckners, Oberösterreichische Schriften zur Volksmusik, Band 16, Klaus Petermayr (Ed.), Anton Bruckner Institut Linz, 2015
 Uwe Harten, Anton Bruckner. Ein Handbuch. , Salzburg, 1996. .
 Cornelis van Zwol, Anton Bruckner 1824–1896 – Leven en werken'', uitg. Thoth, Bussum, Netherlands, 2012.

External links 
 
 Der Mondabend A Dur – WAB 200 – Critical discography by Hans Roelofs 
 Der Mondabend, lieder.net

Lieder by Anton Bruckner
1850 compositions
Compositions in A major
Music dedicated to family or friends